Russell Pleasant Hodges (June 18, 1910 – April 19, 1971) was an American sportscaster who did play-by-play for several baseball teams, most notably the New York Giants / San Francisco Giants. He is perhaps best remembered for his call of Bobby Thomson's "Shot Heard 'Round the World"—The Giants win the pennant! The Giants win the pennant!

Early career
Born in Dayton, Tennessee, Hodges began his broadcasting career in 1934. He was sports editor of WBT, Charlotte, North Carolina until October 1941, when he moved full-time to WOL in Washington, D.C., where he had already been doing play-by-play for the Washington Redskins.  He worked for the Chicago Cubs, Chicago White Sox, Washington Senators, and Cincinnati Reds before landing in New York City with the New York Yankees and New York Giants, who during much of the 1940s only broadcast home games and shared the same radio team — lead announcer Mel Allen and No. 2 man Hodges.

From April 14, 1948 to April 22, 1949, Hodges hosted the 15-minute DuMont series Scoreboard, also known as Russ Hodges' Scoreboard. In 1949, Hodges became a No. 1 announcer when the Giants and the Yankees separated their radio networks to each broadcast a full, 154-game schedule. He was the voice of the Giants for the next 22 seasons on both coasts.

1951 Bobby Thomson home run call
On October 3, 1951, Hodges was on the microphone for Bobby Thomson's "Shot Heard 'Round the World". It was Hodges who cried, "The Giants win the pennant! The Giants win the pennant!"

This famous moment in sports broadcasting was nearly lost. This was in an era before all game broadcasts were recorded. However, in his autobiography, Hodges related how a Brooklyn fan, excited over what appeared to be a certain Dodger victory, hooked up his home tape recorder to his radio. The fan wanted to capture Hodges "crying." Instead, he recorded history; the next day, he called Hodges and said, "You have to have this tape". In reality the fan, Lawrence Goldberg, was a lifelong Giants fan. On the 50th anniversary of the game, Goldberg told The New York Times Richard Sandomir about his fateful decision: "I knew I wouldn't be able to listen to the broadcast and I knew something was going to happen. It was the third game of the playoffs. That kind of game had to be climactic."

In the years that have followed, Hodges "The Giants win the pennant! The Giants win the pennant!" has been echoed in other sports. Commentators have echoed it when announcing their team's championship victories.

On October 16, 2014, the Giants won the National League pennant on a three-run walk-off homer by Travis Ishikawa, and Fox broadcaster Joe Buck quoted the line as the ball landed in the right-field stands.

This historic call is also preserved at the Hall of Fame at the graphic aspect with the original score sheet Hodges was personally logging. Under Thomson's name in the ninth inning slot, there begins a long streak across the entire score sheet where Hodges, pencil to the paper awaiting the outcome of the at-bat, jumped up in excitement, and his pencil-holding hand streaked across his score sheet, unintentionally capturing the moment.

In the film The Godfather, Sonny Corleone is listening to this broadcast on his car radio when he is murdered at a toll booth. The broadcast is also used in an episode of M*A*S*H and has been fictionalised in the first chapter of Don DeLillo's epic magnum opus novel, Underworld, (published separately as a novella under the title Pafko at the Wall.)

In the film Parental Guidance, Artie Decker (Billy Crystal) plays the broadcast for his grandson Turner (Joshua Rush), as a way of boosting his self-esteem due to his speech impediment. At the end of the film, Turner delivers the commentary at his sister's recital without a single stutter, receiving a standing ovation.

Later career
When the Giants moved to San Francisco in 1958, Hodges followed the club west. He continued working for the team through 1970, when he retired. His signature home run call was, "Bye-Bye, Baby!", a phrase that was set to music as the Giants' theme song during the 1960s. It had previously been the name of another song.

Hodges was also the lead announcer for Pabst Blue Ribbon Bouts on CBS from 1948 to 1955. The most famous fight called by Hodges was Muhammad Ali vs. Sonny Liston, one of the most anticipated, watched, and controversial fights in boxing history. Some other fights Hodges called include Beau Jack vs. Ike Williams, Joe Louis vs. Ezzard Charles, Sugar Ray Robinson vs. Jake LaMotta, Floyd Patterson vs. Hurricane Jackson, and Joe Louis vs. Cesar Brion. Hodges, who had played halfback for the University of Kentucky before suffering a broken ankle in his sophomore year, also broadcast professional and college football at various times in his career, including several years in which he teamed with Giants partner Lon Simmons to call San Francisco 49ers radio broadcasts.

Death and subsequent honors
Hodges died suddenly of a heart attack at age 60 in Mill Valley, California, on April 19, 1971. He was survived by his wife, Gay, and two children from a previous marriage.

The National Sportscasters and Sportswriters Association inducted Hodges into its Hall of Fame in 1975. In 1980, became the fourth recipient of the Ford C. Frick Award for excellence in baseball broadcasting from the Baseball Hall of Fame. In 2000, the Giants named the broadcast booths in their new ballpark the Hodges-Simmons Broadcast Center in honor of Hodges and his former partner Lon Simmons. In 2008, Hodges was elected into the Bay Area Radio Hall of Fame, joining his longtime broadcast partner Simmons, who was inducted in 2006.

References

External links
 Russ Hodges Ford C. Frick Award biography at the National Baseball Hall of Fame
 TellItGoodbye.com Audio Page – Featuring Russ Hodges and Lon Simmons

1910 births
1971 deaths
American radio sports announcers
American television sports announcers
Boxing commentators
Chicago Cubs announcers
Chicago White Sox announcers
Cincinnati Reds announcers
College football announcers
Ford C. Frick Award recipients
Kentucky Wildcats football players
Major League Baseball broadcasters
National Football League announcers
New York Giants (NL) announcers
New York Yankees announcers
People from Dayton, Tennessee
San Francisco 49ers announcers
San Francisco Giants announcers
Washington Senators (1901–1960) announcers